Red Rock Pass is a mountain pass in the northern Rocky Mountains of the western United States.

The pass separates Beaverhead County, Montana, (west) from Fremont County, Idaho (east), and is traversed by an unimproved gravel road.

During the Nez Perce War of 1877, a band of Nez Perce crossed the pass on August 20, shortly after the Battle of Camas Creek, en route to Yellowstone National Park.

See also
 List of mountain passes in Montana

Notes

Mountain passes of Idaho
Mountain passes of Montana
Great Divide of North America
Landforms of Fremont County, Idaho
Landforms of Beaverhead County, Montana
Borders of Idaho
Borders of Montana